Viva Las Buffy! is a comic book storyline based on the Buffy the Vampire Slayer television series that was published in Buffy the Vampire Slayer #51–54 by Dark Horse Comics. It was reprinted in a trade paperback collected edition.

Story description

General synopsis

After burning down her school gym Buffy was expelled and is now finding it hard to cope with her Slayer duties since her Watcher, Merrick, is dead. She escapes to Las Vegas along with her friend Pike. They work in one of the casinos which, as it happens, is run by two vampires. Angel is also around in the background helping her out although she does not know it.

At the end, Pike realizes he cannot stay with Buffy, and that even friendship between them might endanger the both of them, so he leaves Buffy alone.

Buffy the Vampire Slayer #51

Comic title: Viva Las Buffy!, Act 1: Broken Parts 

It's 1996, and Buffy Summers has recently discovered her role as the Vampire Slayer. She goes to Las Vegas to think about her life. Watcher Rupert Giles is puzzled that his slayer has yet to arrive in Sunnydale.

Buffy the Vampire Slayer #52

Comic title: Viva Las Buffy!, Act 2: Full House 

Confused by her new powers as Slayer, Buffy has left Joyce and Dawn behind. Trouble soon arrives when Buffy gradually uncovers a vampiric presence in Las Vegas.

Buffy the Vampire Slayer #53

Comic title: Viva Las Buffy!, Act 3: Deuces Wild 

Pike starts to question the idea of a relationship with the slayer whilst Giles battles to become the next Watcher of the Slayer.

Buffy the Vampire Slayer #54

Comic title: Viva Las Buffy!, Act 4: The Big Fold

In England, Rupert Giles discovers treachery surrounding his aim to become the newest Watcher, while Pike leaves Buffy deciding that his relationship with her might be dangerous for them.

Continuity

Canonical issues

Buffy comics such as this one are not usually considered by fans as canonical. Some fans consider them to be stories from the imaginations of authors and artists, while other fans consider them as taking place in an alternative fictional reality. However, unlike fan fiction, overviews summarizing their story, written early in the writing process, were approved by both Fox and Joss Whedon (or his office), and the books were therefore later published as official Buffy merchandise.

Also, the writers, Scott Lobdell, Fabian Nicieza, and Paul Lee made a strong effort to offer a non-contradictory continuity which fills the gap between the events of Buffy burning down her school gym (seen in The Origin), and "Welcome To The Hellmouth". Though, being published before the end of the television series Angel (1999 TV series), "Viva Las Buffy!" directly contradicts the fact that in the episode "Why We Fight," Angel states that the only human he's ever sired while having a soul was Sam Lawson (in Viva they write Angel having also sired their original character Garner Siddle). In the Angel (1999 TV series) episode "The House Always Wins," Angel indicates that it has “been a while” since he's been to Vegas. Saying that there “used to be dunes over there,” and further explaining that Bugsy Segal called them bug piles which means it couldn't have been later than 1947 since he's been in town.